Playing with a Different Sex is the debut studio album by English post-punk band Au Pairs. It was released in 1981 by Human Records.

In its retrospective review, AllMusic described the album as "one of the great, and perhaps forgotten, post-punk records." The album peaked at No. 33 in Britain and produced the single "It's Obvious", which reached No. 37 on the Club Play Singles chart in America in 1981.

Themes 
Many of the songs on the album deal with sexual politics. In "Repetition", a David Bowie cover, domestic violence is explored ("I guess the bruises won't show/If she wears long sleeves"), and the possessiveness underlying an open relationship is pilloried in "We're So Cool" ("you must admit/I'm prepared to share/At off-peak times").

Allegations of rape and torture of Irish women imprisoned in the city of Armagh in Northern Ireland are the core content of the song "Armagh", which challenges the notion that "civilized nations" do not torture. The refrain, "We don't torture, we're a civilized nation / We're avoiding any confrontation / We don't torture..." is repeated throughout the song. The lyrics point out that the "American hostages in Iran, [are] heard daily on the news..." while "You can ignore the 32." They continue: "There are 32 women in Armagh jail / Political prisoners here at home," before describing alleged incidents of abuse. The song led to limited distribution of the album in Ireland, when Northern Irish record distributors refused to carry it.

The song "Come Again" refers to the social pressure to "achieve orgasmic equality"; a 1982 profile in Mother Jones notes that the song depicts sex "as a dreary ritual in which partners as joyless as lab rats press bars and nose buttons in the hopes of an orgasm as dry and quantifiable as kibble." The song, directed at "those who changed the game" and "brought in new rules", asks "is it real? Are you feeling it?", before turning into a dialogue between the female lead singer and male back up who is evidently attempting to satisfy her: "Am I doing it right?" he asks, and the woman reassures him, "You're not selfish/You're trying hard to please me – please, please me/Is your finger aching?/I can feel you hesitating." The song was banned from the BBC, who feared parental backlash.

Reissue 
The album was reissued in 1992 on CD by RPM Records, a subsidiary of Cherry Red Records, with an additional eight tracks, consisting of singles, remixes and previously unreleased songs.

Critical response 

In a 1981 review for Record Mirror, Mark Cooper wrote that the Au Pairs' "critique of all forms of possession and sexual stereotyping assumes a devastating power." Playing with a Different Sex was ranked at number 17 on NMEs list of the best albums of 1981.

Describing the album in The Rough Guide to Rock (2003), Owen James referred to the band's mix of humour and righteous anger, stating "They don't make them like this anymore." In 2002's She's a Rebel: The History of Women in Rock & Roll, Gillian G. Gaar suggested that "the taut rhythms and aggressive lyrics of Different Sex make it a classic example of how the influence of punk could steer rock into exciting new areas." The song "Diet", originally released as a single in 1980 and recorded for a session for BBC Radio 1 in 1981, was later released on Equal but Different (1994), a compilation of twenty of the band's BBC performances, and included on the extended reissue of Playing with a Different Sex; it was described by Fact as a "masterpiece of feminist rock" with an almost unparalleled "power and pathos".

Track listing 
All tracks are written by Paul Foad, Peter Hammond, Jane Munro and Lesley Woods, except where noted.

Side A 
"We're So Cool" – 3:29
"Love Song" – 2:51
"Set-Up" – 3:21
"Repetition" (David Bowie) – 3:34
"Headache for Michelle" – 6:39

Side B 
"Come Again" – 3:54
"Armagh" – 3:37
"Unfinished Business" – 3:29
"Dear John" – 2:57
"It's Obvious" – 6:19

Reissue bonus tracks 
"You" – 2:52
"Domestic Departure" – 2:22
"Kerb Crawler" – 2:47
"Diet" – 4:19
"It's Obvious" (single version) – 5:47
"Inconvenience" (12" version) – 2:56
"Pretty Boys" – 3:40
"Headache for Michelle" (remix) – 6:38

Personnel 
Credits are adapted from the album's liner notes.

Au Pairs
 Jane Munro – bass guitar, production
 Lesley Woods – guitar, vocals, production
 Paul Foad – guitar, backing vocals, production
 Peter Hammond – drums, production

Technical
 Eve Arnold – cover photography
 Martin Culverwell – production, sleeve design
 John Dent – mastering
 Rocking Russian – sleeve design
 Ken Thomas – production, engineering

Charts

References 

Sources

External links 
 

1981 debut albums
Au Pairs (band) albums
Albums produced by Ken Thomas (record producer)